Adivi Baapiraju (1895–1952) was an Indian polymath, who was a novelist in Telugu language, playwright, painter, art director, and anti-colonial nationalist known for his works in Telugu theater, and cinema. He is known for his literary works such as Gonaganna Reddy, Narayana Rao, and Himabindu.

Life
Baapiraju was born on 8 October 1895, at Sarepalle, near Bhimavaram in West Godavari district of Andhra. He obtained primary education in Bhimavaram and higher education at Narsapur and Rajamahendravaram. He visited tourist places around the country like Ajanta, Hampi etc. and that is how his interest in arts and paintings developed. Inspired by the likes of Bipin Chandra Pal, Baapiraju participated in the Non-cooperation movement in 1921 and was jailed from 1922 for about a year. He remembered his experiences in jail in his book "tolakari". After his release Baapiraju attended the Law college in Madras. He practiced law in Bhimavaram for anyear and then he later gave it up.

Baapiraju served as the principal of Jateeya Kalasala of Machilipatnam for a brief period. In 1934 he gave up the job of principal to enter the Telugu film industry as an art director. He directed Dhruva Vijayam, Meerabhai, and Anasuya.  Baapiraju edited the Telugu daily Mijan, published from Hyderabad from 1943 to 1946. Baapiraju wrote over a hundred stories. He also provided paintings for Viswanatha Satyanarayana's Kinerasani Patalu and Nanduri's Enkipatalu. Baapiraju died in 1952.

Family Tree of Sri Adivi Baapiraju

Works

As writer
 HimaBindu
 Gona Gannareddy
 Adivi Shantisree
 Anshumathi
 Ottunga Srungam
 Narayana Rao
 Konangi
 Thoofanu
 Jajimalli
 Narudu
 Shailabala
 Bhogiraloya
 Veena
 Ragamalika
 Tarangini
 Nelathalli
 Anjali
 Narasanna Papayi
 Vadagallu
 Gaalivaana
 Rajakar
 Goduli
 Shashikala
 Tholakari

As Painter
 Sasikala
 Shabda Bramha
 Sundari Nandudu
 Bhagavatha Purushudu
 Suryadeva
 Samudragupta
 Mruthyunjaya
 Thikkana
 Paintings for 'Kinnerasani patalu' of Viswanatha Satyanarayana

References 

1895 births
1952 deaths
Telugu writers
Telugu people
People from West Godavari district
20th-century Indian poets
Novelists from Andhra Pradesh
20th-century Indian dramatists and playwrights
20th-century Indian novelists
Painters from Andhra Pradesh
Indian male painters
20th-century Indian painters
Indian male dramatists and playwrights
Indian male novelists
Indian male poets
Dramatists and playwrights from Andhra Pradesh
20th-century Indian male writers
20th-century Indian male artists